Therese Rhodes (born ) is an Australian female cyclo-cross cyclist. She represented her nation in the women's elite event at the 2016 UCI Cyclo-cross World Championships in Heusden-Zolder.

References

External links
 Profile at cyclingarchives.com

1988 births
Living people
Cyclo-cross cyclists
Australian female cyclists
Place of birth missing (living people)
Australian mountain bikers